The Hobie Tiger or Hobie Tiger 18, is a French catamaran sailboat that was designed by Hobie Cat Europe as a Formula 18 racer and first built in 1995.

The boat is an International Sailing Federation recognized international class.

Production
The design was built by Hobie Cat Europe in France, starting in 1995 and later by the parent company Hobie Cat in the United States in 2001, but it is now out of production.

Design

The Hobie Tiger is a sailing dinghy, with the twin hulls built predominantly of polyester fiberglass sandwich with a foam core.

The hulls have plumb stems and transoms, transom-hung rudders controlled by a single tiller and twin retractable daggerboards. It has a fractional sloop rig with aluminum spars, including a rotating mast, stepped on the fore beam. The rigging is wire. It displaces  and is normally sailed by a crew of two sailors, both of whom are provided with trapezes to balance the boat.

The design has a Portsmouth Yardstick RYA PN handicap number of 693.

See also
List of multihulls
List of sailing boat types

References

External links

Catamarans
Dinghies
1990s sailboat type designs
One-design sailing classes
Sailboat type designs by Hobie Cat Europe
Sailboat types built by Hobie Cat Europe